Narendeh (also Romanized as Nārendeh, Nārandeh; also known as Nārenshed, Nārīndeh, and Narin-Dekh) is a village in Ilat-e Qaqazan-e Sharqi Rural District, Kuhin District, Qazvin County, Qazvin Province, Iran. At the 2006 census, its population was 83, in 35 families.

References 

Populated places in Qazvin County